A physical training uniform is a military uniform used during exercise, calisthenics, drills, and in some cases, very casual periods of time (off-duty time during Initial Entry Training in the U.S. Army, for example). Most militaries, especially the United States Armed Forces and their auxiliaries (e.g. ROTC and JROTC components) require use of a physical training (PT) uniform during unit exercise (including formation runs, calisthenics, and conditioning exercises). All items worn by military personnel conducting PT as a group are subject to uniformity, at commander discretions, however, some U.S. military units produce unique T-shirts with their unit insignia and motto, and for special events, this shirt is part of the uniform. Occasionally, exercise will also be conducted in that branch's utility uniforms, normally with the blouse removed and the undershirt exposed (also known as "boots and utes"  ). For unit runs, esprit de corps or special occasions, commanders may have personnel wear unique T-shirts with the distinctive unit insignia and unit colors.

Physical Training Uniforms of the United States Armed Forces

Army

The Army Physical Fitness Uniform (APFU) consists of:
Shirts: Black long-sleeve and short-sleeve shirts with gold ARMY lettering on the front.
Shorts: Black with same gold ARMY lettering on the left leg. Multipurpose: can be worn alone for swimming and exercise, or under the black pants.
Pants: Black with Army Star logo and lettering on the left thigh.
Jacket: Black with gold chevron across the front and back and same Army Star logo and lettering on the left chest. A Physical Fitness Badge may be worn for soldiers who excel at the APFT (270 or higher, with a 90 in each event).
Socks and Shoes: Commercial calf-length or ankle-length, plain white or black socks with no logos, and approved, well-fitting, comfortable running shoes with no color restriction; Five-toed shoes are prohibited.
Inclement weather gear: Micro fleece cap, Compression shirt and shorts, and reflective belt.

Marine Corps

The Marine Corps PTUs consist of:
Shirt: Plain olive-drab green short-sleeve shirt (logos can be authorized.)
Shorts: Plain OD green shorts (logos can be authorized for this also.)
Sweatsuit: OD green with black Marines logo and USMC lettering on the left chest of sweatshirt, and the same design on the left thigh of sweatpants.
Tracksuit: OD green with reflective piping, reflective Marines logo on the left chest and MARINES lettering in red with gold outline centered on the back of jacket, and same logo on the upper left thigh and vertical USMC lettering in the same design on the lower right leg of pants.
Socks and Shoes: commercial calf-length or ankle-length, plain white or black socks with no logos, and shoes with appropriate civilian design; excessively bright coloring or designs are prohibited.
Hydration pack: green or coyote brown (or subdued colors if personally owned packs are authorized.)
Inclement weather gear: Compression shorts, OD green thermal shirt and pants, and reflective belt.

The Marine Corps announced that a significant update to its shirt-and-shorts PTU is in development, with the new uniform featuring a reflective design for the first time.

Navy

The Navy PTU's nylon moisture wicking and odor resistant Navy blue shorts come in six and eight inch lengths, providing standard appearance among different height sailors. It also has side pockets with a hidden ID card pocket inside the waistband.

The Navy PTUs consist of:
Shirt: Navy blue short-sleeve shirt with gold eagle-and-anchor logo on the left chest and the statement "America's Navy: Forged By The Sea" in gold on the back.
Shorts: Navy blue with gold NAVY lettering on the left leg.
Tracksuit: Styled similar to the Marines' except dark navy blue with same gold NAVY lettering on the left chest and on the back of jacket, only larger, and styled vertically on the lower right leg of pants.
Sweatsuit: Navy blue with reflective NAVY lettering on the same areas on sweatshirt with optional hood, and on the left thigh of sweatpants.
Shoes: Approved, well-fitting, comfortable running shoes with no color restriction.
Inclement weather gear: Compression shorts and reflective belt.

The Navy announced that an additional standard navy blue uniform with a not-yet-known design is in development, with a retirement date for the gold-shirt uniform pending.

Air Force

The Air Force Improved Physical Training Uniform (IPTU) consists of:
Shirts and Sweatshirt: Light-grey short-sleeve and long-sleeve shirts and sweatshirt with reflective Air Force logo and lettering on the left chests, and logo centered on the backs.
Shorts: Air Force blue with reflective stripes on the sides and the same AF logo and lettering on the left leg.
Pants: AF blue with piping on the lower legs.
Jacket: Styled similar to the Army's except AF blue with silver reflective chevron outlined by white piping across the front and back and same AF logo and lettering on the left chest, but embroidered. An optional hood is hidden in the collar and can be pulled out during inclement weather.
Socks and Shoes: Athletic-style shoes with no color restriction, and white and black socks; small logos are authorized.

The Air Force has finalized minor changes to its PTU, with the new uniform currently awaiting its release, and a four-year retirement period for the IPTU taking place until 2026, after 20 years of use.

Space Force
Throughout the U.S. Space Force’s first three years of its existence, guardians borrowed the Air Force’s IPTU; however, its first unique PT uniform, moderately resembling the Air Force’s design, was finalized in 2021, and is also currently awaiting its release.

Coast Guard
The Coast Guard PTUs consist of:
Shirt: Grey short-sleeve shirt with reflective Coast Guard logo with blue outline and lettering on the left chest, and COAST GUARD lettering in the same design centered on the back.
Shorts: Mesh-designed navy blue shorts with white COAST GUARD lettering on the left leg.
Sweatsuit: Navy blue with COAST GUARD lettering in orange with white and dark reflective outline centered on the front and 7 dark reflective stripes on the back of sweatshirt, and USCG lettering in the same design on the sides of both legs of sweatpants.
Swimsuits: Plain blue gender-standard swimsuits.
Socks and Shoes: White and black socks (small logos are authorized), and athletic-style shoes; excessively bright coloring or designs are prohibited.
Inclement weather gear: Watch cap, gloves, earmuffs, and reflective belts.

Non-military use
In many parts of the world outside of use in militaries, physical training uniforms are primarily used in schools, law enforcement academies, and in some cases, scouting, firefighter training and prison systems.

See also
Uniforms of the United States Armed Forces
Military uniform
Full dress uniform
Mess dress uniform
Service dress uniform
Combat uniform
Casual wear
Work wear
Sportswear

References

Military uniforms
History of fashion